Allison Shreeve (born 5 February 1982) is an Australian athlete who was the PWA World Tour Champion 2004 and Formula World Windsurfing Champion in 2005, 2006 and 2007.

Career

Speed sailing
In November 2005, Shreeve set a new world speed sailing record (A class) at 27.7 Knots (51.3 km/h) at Saintes Maries de la Mer Speed Canal. She topped this with a record of 33.05 (61.2 km/h) knots at Fuerteventura in late July, 2006.

See also
Robby Naish
Bjorn Dunkerbeck

References

External links
 
 

1982 births
Living people
Australian windsurfers
Female windsurfers
Australian Christians
Sportspeople from Sydney
Sportswomen from New South Wales